Standings and results for Group 4 of the UEFA Euro 1988 qualifying tournament.

Group 4 consisted of England, Northern Ireland, Turkey and Yugoslavia. Group winners were England, who finished 3 points clear of second-placed Yugoslavia.

Final table

Results

Goalscorers

References
UEFA page
 RSSSF page

Group 4
1986–87 in English football
qual
1986–87 in Yugoslav football
1987–88 in Yugoslav football
1986–87 in Northern Ireland association football
1987–88 in Northern Ireland association football
1986–87 in Turkish football
1987–88 in Turkish football